When Worlds Collide is a 1932 science fiction novel by Philip Wylie and Edwin Balmer.

When Worlds Collide may also refer to:

Film and television
 When Worlds Collide (1951 film), an adaptation of the 1932 novel
 "When Worlds Collide" (Numbers), an episode of Numbers
 "When Worlds Collide", an episode of the anime series Digimon Fusion
 "When Worlds Collide", an episode of the Nickelodeon series Side Hustle

Music

Albums
 When Worlds Collide (Maroon album), 2006
 When Worlds Collide (Thin White Rope album), 1994
 When Worlds Collide: A Tribute to Daniel Amos, a 1999 compilation album
 When Worlds Collide, a 2009 album by The Vendetta and Danny Diablo
 When Worlds Collide, a 1997 album by 1.8.7

Songs
 "When Worlds Collide" (Powerman 5000 song), 1999
 "When Worlds Collide" (Zara Larsson song), 2013, from her debut EP Introducing

Other uses
 ECW When Worlds Collide, 1994 and 1996 professional wrestling events
 When Worlds Collide, the 30th episode of the anime series Digimon Fusion
 When Worlds Collide (role-playing game), 2010

See also
 Worlds Collide (disambiguation)
 Worlds in Collision, a 1950 book by Immanuel Velikovsky
 "Two Worlds Collide", a song by Inspiral Carpets from Cool As
 "When Two Worlds Collide", a song by Iron Maiden from Virtual XI